The Easey Street murders, often simplified to just Easey Street, refer to the knife murders of two women in Collingwood, Victoria, Australia, an inner suburb of Melbourne, in January 1977. Described as "Victoria’s most brutal crime", the case remains unsolved despite a A$1 million reward being posted in 2017.

Background 
Suzanne Armstrong (28), a single mother who had a child while staying on Naxos, Greece, and Susan Bartlett (27), a schoolteacher at the Collingwood Education Centre, were old high-school friends from regional Benalla, Victoria, who had moved to Melbourne. They had rented the property at 147 Easey Street in October 1976, ten weeks prior to the killings. Their terrace house consisted of a long corridor with three bedrooms, leading to a rear kitchen, bathroom, and backyard area. On the night of the attack, Bartlett's brother and his girlfriend had visited for dinner before watching television and leaving around 9:00 pm.

Murders 
Neighbours first noted a problem when they retrieved a pet dog, a German Shepherd puppy, belonging to the two which had been wandering the area the next day. Neighbours had also heard Armstrong's 16-month-old son, Gregory, whimpering in the days after the attack. Finally, three days after the women were killed, the neighbours entered via the back door; Gregory was found unharmed, but distressed and dehydrated in his cot. The women's bodies were also discovered near the front of the house.

Investigation
Police believe that Armstrong and Bartlett were both killed on the night of 10 January 1977. The women had been stabbed multiple times – Armstrong 29 times and Bartlett 55 times. Armstrong's body was found on her bed whereas Bartlett's was found in the hallway near the front door (which was next to Armstrong's bedroom).

When detectives investigated, there were no signs of forced entry  though a footprint on the front window sill indicated a possible entry point. They also noted that the killer had cleaned up in the bathroom after the killings and exited via the back door and the lane-way gate, leaving them both open. The kitchen light was left on and a murder weapon was not found. A note from Armstrong's new boyfriend, who had visited the property with his brother (who was Bartlett's sister's boyfriend) via the back door on 12 January at around 8:30 pm was also found on the kitchen table.

Police eventually established a list of 130 'persons of interest' related to the case. The list included construction workers who were in the process of building at 365 Hoddle Street, the property behind the house. Media also reported that the women had been sexually assaulted as well. Armstrong had been raped postmortem and a semen sample was found at the scene. In 1999, detectives DNA tested the case's eight prime suspects, one of whom had returned to the UK, without success.

The murders were later linked to the disappearance and probable murder of Julie Garciacelay, a librarian originally from Stockton, United States. Garciacelay had disappeared from her North Melbourne, Victoria apartment on 1 July 1975. The suspect in that case, a crime reporter and work friend of Garciacelay at Truth, had been staying in the house next to the Easey Street killings on the night of the attacks. 

However, despite investigations by a team of sixteen detectives, the case quickly went cold and the murders remain unsolved. In 2011, however, the case was quietly re-opened under the supervision of the detective Ron Iddles. On 15 January 2017, forty years after the murders, Victoria Police offered a reward of up to $1 million for information leading to the apprehension and subsequent conviction of the person or persons responsible for the attacks.

Legacy 
Gregory Armstrong was adopted and raised in Queensland by his mother's younger sister, who has also continually advocated for the solving of the case in the media. Interest in the case has persisted, particularly when the property was sold (after remaining vacant for six years) in 1983, then in 2011, and again in 2017.

Australian artist Steve Cox lived in Easey Street, diagonally opposite to the murder house, between 1978 and 1979. He later made a number of artworks based on this case.

A book by Tom Prior, They trusted men: The untold story of the Easey Street murders, was published in 1996. In March 2019, a book by Helen Thomas called Murder on Easey Street: Melbourne's Most Notorious Cold Case was published. Thomas was interviewed by True Crime Conversations about the case in November 2019. 

In June 2018, Andrew Rule released a podcast on the case called The horror at Easey St. Rule also interviewed Thomas in a March 2019 follow up podcast. In April–May 2019, Unsolved Murders: True Crime Stories ran a 2-part dramatised episode on the case. In April 2022, Australian crime podcast Casefile featured the case in episode 207.

See also
List of unsolved murders

References

Further reading
Tom Prior, They trusted men: The untold story of the Easey Street murders, Melbourne, Wilkinson, 1996. 

1970s missing person cases
1975 murders in Australia
1977 murders in Australia
Deaths by stabbing in Australia
Formerly missing people
January 1977 crimes
Missing person cases in Australia
Murder in Melbourne
Unsolved murders in Australia